The Illinois State Bar Association (ISBA) is among largest voluntary state bar associations in the United States. Approximately 28,000 lawyers are members of the ISBA. Unlike some state bar associations, in which membership is mandatory, ISBA membership is not required of lawyers licensed to practice in Illinois and ISBA membership is completely voluntary. The ISBA is headquartered in Springfield, Illinois.  It also has an office in Chicago, Illinois.

History
The ISBA was founded on January 4, 1877, at a meeting held in the Sangamon County Courthouse in Springfield, Illinois, attended by 88 lawyers from 37 counties. According to the association’s constitution adopted at that time, the purpose of the association is: 

This first meeting elected Anthony Thornton as first president of the ISBA. In 1879, the ISBA gained notoriety after it granted honorary membership to Myra Bradwell and Ada Kepley after they were denied admission to the bar on the grounds that they were women. Responding to a request from the Supreme Court of Illinois on how to improve the quality of Illinois lawyers, in 1897 the ISBA and the Chicago Bar Association recommended that the court require lawyers to have at least a high school education; they also recommended creating what would become the Illinois Board of Admissions to the Bar. The Illinois Supreme Court accepted both recommendations.

The ISBA would later lead a crusade against the unauthorized practice of law; in 1931, they brought a suit against People’s Stock Yards State Bank in which they persuaded the Illinois Supreme Court to declare that it had the inherent authority to punish anyone who practiced law without a law license. The ISBA spent decades lobbying for reform of Illinois' civil procedure, and this ultimately paid off in 1933, when the Illinois General Assembly passed the Civil Practice Act of 1933. In 1962, the ISBA led a campaign to change the judicial article of the Illinois Constitution. The ISBA also played a large role in developing the current Illinois Criminal Code (1961) and Illinois Code of Criminal Procedure (1963). In the 1970s and 1980s, the ISBA lobbied successfully to have Illinois adopt a regime of no-fault divorce and for independent administration of decedents' estates. The ISBA also played a role in creating the Illinois Institute for Continuing Legal Education, the Client Security Fund of the Bar of Illinois, the Lawyers’ Assistance Program, and the Lawyers Trust Fund.

Organization and activities
The ISBA is currently divided into 40 substantive law divisions, allowing ISBA members the opportunity to meet other lawyers who practice in the same field. Each section publishes a newsletter to keep its members aware of substantive changes in the field of law. The sections also offer continuing legal education services for members.  One of these sections, the Young Lawyers Division, is for lawyers 36 years old and younger, and is designed to give young lawyers an opportunity to meet and discuss issues peculiar to younger practitioners.

The ISBA operates 26 standing committees and several special committees, councils, and task forces created by either the Assembly or the Board of Governors (see below for more information about the Assembly and Board of Governors). Each committee consists mainly of members appointed by the ISBA president. These committees study issues facing the legal community and make recommendations to the ISBA Assembly. The association sponsors a number of online and print publications, including: the Illinois Bar Journal, dozens of section newsletters, the Illinois Courts Bulletin, and its blog Illinois Lawyer Now. Members also receive E-Clips, a daily email newsletter summarizing legal news and case updates.

Other ISBA highlights include:
 Member benefits, including: Fastcase online legal research service, On-Demand online CLE courses, automated legal form builder IllinoisBarDocs, an online Career Center, an online Lawyer Referral Service, meeting space in its Chicago and Springfield offices, and the ability to purchase malpractice insurance through the ISBA Mutual Insurance Company.
 Legal resources for the public, including: consumer guides covering dozens of legal issues and an online lawyer search tool called IllinoisLawyerFinder. 
Awards recognizing professional achievement in the legal profession, the most prestigious of which is the ISBA Laureate Award. The Illinois State Bar Association’s Academy of Illinois Lawyers was founded in 1999 to recognize those who personify excellence in the legal profession. The Laureate Award, the Academy’s highest honor, is awarded to those deemed to exemplify the highest ideals of the profession.
 Its charitable wing, the Illinois Bar Foundation that promotes pro bono work and other legal work in the public interest. The association also administers the annual ISBA High School Mock Trial Invitational, a mock trial tournament for high school students, with the winning team representing Illinois at the National High School Mock Trial Championship.

The ISBA's supreme policy making body is the ISBA Assembly. The Assembly has 203 lawyer members elected on a pro rata basis from the judicial circuits. The Assembly routinely meets twice a year. It has taken positions on a number of important matters, including repeal of the death penalty in Illinois, support of civil unions, and support of U.S. ratification of the convention to Eliminate All Forms of Discrimination Against Women (CEDAW). Between meetings of the Assembly, the ISBA is governed by a 27-member Board of Governors, which oversees the operations and management of ISBA and is subject to policies set by the 203-member Assembly. The Board of Governors is headed by the president of the ISBA. The president is elected by the Assembly.

List of presidents of the ISBA

 Anthony Thornton, Shelbyville, 1877-1879
 David McCulloch, Peoria, 1880
 Orville Hickman Browning, Quincy, 1881
 Elijah B. Sherman, Chicago 1881
 Charles C. Bonney, Chicago, 1882
 William L. Gross, Springfield, 1883
 David Davis, Bloomington, 1884
 Benjamin S. Edwards, Springfield, 1885
 Melville Fuller, Chicago, 1886
 E. B. Green, Mount Carmel, 1887
 Thomas Dent, Chicago, 1888
 Ethelbert Callahan, Robinson, 1889
 James B. Bradwell, Chicago, 1890
 James M. Riggs, Winchester, 1891
 Lyman Trumbull, Chicago, 1892
 Samuel P. Wheeler, Springfield, 1893
 Elliott Anthony, Chicago, 1894
 Oliver H. Harker, Carbondale, 1895
 John H. Hamline, Chicago, 1896-1897
 Alfred Orendorff, Springfield, 1897-1898
 Harvey B. Hurd, Chicago, 1898-1899
 Benson Wood, Effingham, 1899-1900
 Jessie Holdom, Chicago, 1900-1901
 John Sanborn Stevens, Peoria, 1901-1902
 Murray F. Tuley, Chicago, 1902-1903
 Charles L. Capen, Bloomington, 1903-1904
 Stephen S. Gregory, Chicago, 1904-1905
 George True Page, Peoria, 1905-1906
 Harrison Musgrave, Chicago, 1906-1907
 James H. Matheny, Springfield, 1907-1908
 E. P. Williams, Galesburg, 1908-1909
 Edgar A. Bancroft, Chicago, 1909-1910
 William R. Curran, Pekin, 1910-1911
 Horace K. Tenney, Chicago, 1911-1912
 Harry Higbee, Pittsfield, 1912-1913
 Robert McMurdy, Chicago, 1913-1914
 Edward C. Kramer, East St. Louis, 1914-1915
 Nathan William MacChesney, Chicago, 1915-1916
 Albert D. Early, Rockford, 1916-1917
 Edgar Bronson Tolman, Chicago, 1917-1918
 Walter M. Provine, Taylorville, 1918-1919
 Frederick A. Brown, Chicago, 1919-1920
 Logan Hay, Springfield, 1920-1921
 Silas H. Strawn, Chicago, 1921-1922
 Bruce A. Campbell, East St. Louis, 1922-1923
 Roger Sherman, Chicago, 1923-1924
 C.M. Clay Buntain, Kankakee, 1924-1925
 John R. Montgomery, Chicago, 1925-1926
 George H. Wilson, Quincy, 1926-1927
 Rush C. Butler, Chicago, 1927-1928
 Franklin L. Velde, Pekin, 1928-1929
 John D. Black, Chicago, 1929-1930
 Clarence W. Heyl, Peoria, 1930-1931
 Amos C. Miller, Chicago, 1931-1932
 June C. Smith, Centralia, 1932-1933
 Floyd E. Thompson, Chicago, 1933-1934
 James S. Baldwin, Decatur, 1934-1935
 Charles P. Megan, Chicago, 1935-1936
 Cairo A. Trimble, Princeton, 1936-1937
 John F. Voigt, Chicago, 1937-1938
 William D. Knight, Rockford, 1938-1939
 Charles O. Rundall, Chicago, 1939-1940
 Albert J. Harno, Urbana, 1940-1941
 Benjamin Wham, Chicago, 1941-1942
 Clarence W. Diver, Waukegan, 1942-1943
 Warren B. Buckley, Chicago, 1943-1944
 Henry C. Warner, Dixon, 1944-1945
 Tappan Gregory, Chicago, 1945-1946
 Kaywin Kennedy, Bloomington, 1946-1947
 William M. James, Chicago, 1947-1948
 Amos H. Robillard, Kankakee, 1948-1949
 Albert E. Jenner, Jr., Chicago, 1949-1950
 Aubrey L. Yantis, Shelbyville, 1950-1951
 Joseph H. Hinshaw, Chicago, 1951-1952
 Thomas J. Welch, Kewanee, 1952-1953
 Timothy I. McKnight, Chicago, 1953-1954
 Karl C. Williams, Rockford, 1954-1955
 Thomas S. Edmonds, Chicago, 1955-1956
 James G. Thomas, Champaign, 1956-1957
 Barnabas F. Sears, Chicago, 1957-1958
 Timothy W. Swain, Peoria, 1958-1959
 David J. A. Hayes, Chicago, 1959 (died in office)
 Gerald C. Snyder, Waukegan, 1959-1960
 Edward B. Love, Monmouth, 1960-1961
 Owen Rall, Chicago, 1961-1962
 Mason Bull, Morrison, 1962-1963
 Horace A. Young, Chicago, 1963-1964
 Stanford S. Meyer, Belleville, 1964-1965
 Peter Fitzpatrick, Chicago, 1965-1966
 Russell N. Sullivan, Champaign, 1966-1967
 Stanton L. Ehrlich, Chicago, 1967-1968
 Alfred Younges Kirkland, Sr., Elgin, 1968-1969
 Henry L. Pitts, Chicago, 1969-1970
 H. Ogden Brainard, Charleston, 1970-1971
 Morton John Barnard, Chicago, 1971-1972
 Lyle W. Allen, Peoria, 1972-1973
 William P. Sutter, Chicago, 1973-1974
 John R. Mackay, Wheaton, 1974-1975
 Lawrence X. Pusateri, Chicago, 1975-1976 (resigned Jan. 2, 1976 to run for Supreme Court of Illinois)
 Francis J. Householter, Kankakee, 1976-1977 (served as president pro tem for remainder of Pusateri's term before being elected to his own term)
 Carole Bellows, Chicago, 1977-1978
 Lloyd J. Tyler, Aurora, 1978-1979
 John C. Mullen, Chicago, 1979-1980
 Robert G. Heckenkamp, Springfield, 1980-1981
 Michel A. Coccia, Chicago, 1981-1982
 John C. Feirich, Carbondale, 1982-1983
 Al Hofeld, Chicago, 1983-1984
 Jon W. DeMoss, Springfield, 1984-1985
 Fred Lane, Chicago, 1985-1986
 Richard L. Thies, Urbana, 1986-1987
 Donald C. Schiller, Chicago, 1987-1988
 Jerome Mirza, Chicago/Bloomington, 1983-1989
 Leonard F. Amari, Chicago, 1989-1990
 Maurice E. Bone, Belleville, 1990-1991
 Thomas A. Clancy, Chicago, 1991-1992
 Peter H. Lousberg, Rock Island, 1992-1993
 Tom Leahy, Chicago, 1993-1994
 David A. Decker, Waukegan, 1994-1995
 Terrence K. Hegarty, Chicago, 1995-1996
 Ralph A. Gabric, Wheaton, 1996-1997
 Todd A. Smith, Chicago, 1997-1998
 Timothy L. Bertschy, Peoria, 1998-1999
 Cheryl Niro, Chicago, 1999-2000
 Herbert H. Franks, Marengo, 2000-2001
 J. Timothy Eaton, Chicago, 2001-2002
 Loren S. Golden, Elgin, 2002-2003
 Terrance J. Lavin, Chicago, 2003-2004
 Ole Bly Pace, Sterling, 2004-2005
 Robert K. Downs, Chicago, 2005-2006
 Irene F. Bahr, Wheaton, 2006-2007
 Joseph G. Bisceglia, Chicago, 2007-2008
 Jack C. Carey, Belleville, 2008-2009
 John G. O'Brien, Arlington Heights, 2009-2010
 Mark D. Hassakis, Mt. Vernon, 2010-2011
 John G. Locallo, Chicago, 2011-2012
John E. Thies, Urbana, 2012-2013
 Paula H. Holderman, Chicago, 2013–2014
 Richard D. Felice, Wheaton, 2014–2015
 Umberto S. Davi, Western Springs, 2015–2016
 Vincent F. Cornelius, Wheaton, 2016–2017 
 Hon. Russell W. Hartigan, Western Springs, 2017–2018 
 Hon. James F. McCluskey, Lisle, 2018–2019
 David B. Sosin, Orland Park, 2019-2020
 Dennis J. Orsey, Granite City, 2020-2021
 Anna P. Krolikowska, Northbrook, 2021-2022
 Rory T. Weiler, St. Charles, 2022-2023

References

General
 Illinois State Bar Association website
 Illinois Bar Foundation website
 ISBA Laureate Award
 Illinois Lawyer Now blog
 ISBA’s consumer website

American state bar associations
1877 establishments in Illinois
Organizations established in 1877
Illinois law